Route of All Evil may refer to:

 "The Route of All Evil", 2002 Futurama episode
 Route of All Evil Tour, 2005-6 concert tour co-headlined by American hard rock band Aerosmith and heavy metal/glam metal band Mötley Crüe1
 "The Route of All Evil", 1995 Home Improvement episode
 "Money: The Route Of All Evil", slogan for the 1981 arcade game Route-16

See also
 Root of all evil (disambiguation)